This is a list of notable Nigerian gospel musicians  arranged in alphabetical order.

Ada Ehi
Bidemi Olaoba
Bola Are
Cobhams Asuquo
Dunni Olanrewaju
Eben
Ebenezer Obey
el Mafrex
Frank Edwards
Funmi Aragbaye
Miinister GUC
Jahdiel
Jeremiah Gyang
Joe Praize
Joseph Adebayo Adelakun
Kefee
Kunle Ajayi
Lara George
Mega 99
Mercy Chinwo
Nathaniel Bassey
Nikki Laoye
Nosa
Obiwon
Onos Ariyo
Onyeka Onwenu
Patty Obasi
Samsong
Sinach
Snatcha
Sola Allyson
Tim Godfrey
Tope Alabi
TY Bello

References

Nigerian gospel
 Nigerian
Nigerian gospel